In the 1851 Chicago mayoral election, Walter S. Gurnee defeated incumbent mayor James Curtiss as well as Eli B. Williams and Edward K. Rogers by a landslide 36.25% margin.

The Whig Party decided against nominating a ticket in the 1851 Chicago municipal elections.

Results
Gurnee defeated incumbent Democrat James Curtiss as well as Eli B. Williams and Edward K. Rogers.

Owing to a large number voters not being in compliance with new election laws, an unprecedented number of voters were refused tickets.

Gurnee received a plurality of votes from all major political parties. It is believed that his vote total from Whigs was as great as his vote total from Democrats. Many political analysts treated the election (which unseated incumbent Democrat James Curtiss) as a "Whig Party victory".

References

1851
Chicago
1851 Illinois elections
1850s in Chicago